Richmond Hill is an area of Bournemouth, Dorset, England. Just to the north of Bournemouth Town Centre, south of Richmond Park and west of Lansdowne. The area is around a road of the same name.

History 
In 2018 and 2019, the road was turned into a temporary waterslide in the summer.

In 2023, Vitality will move into the Nationwide building in Richmond Hill.

Buildings 
 Portman Building Society (formerly)
Bournemouth Daily Echo building
Sacred Heart Church
Norfolk Royale Hotel
 St. Andrew's Church, Richmond Hill – the largest church in Bournemouth

Transportation 
In 1975, the A338 underpass was built underneath Richmond Hill Roundabout.

The Square is at the bottom of Richmond Hill.

Politics 
Richmond Hill is part of the Bournemouth Central ward for elections to the Bournemouth, Christchurch and Poole Council. The same ward elected councillors to Bournemouth Borough Council.

Richmond Hill is also part of the Bournemouth West parliamentary constituency for elections to the House of Commons of the United Kingdom.

Notable people 

 Hubert Parry was born in Richmond Hill
 John Elmes Beale, politician and businessman

Gallery

References 

Areas of Bournemouth